Margaret Swan Forbes was an American swimmer.

Early life and career
Forbes was born in San Antonio, Texas in 1919. She attended Trinity University, where she earned bachelor's and master's degrees in physical education.

During her career, she taught swimming at the San Antonio College and her students include Olympians such as Josh Davis. She also served as a secretary and chairwoman of the Synchronized Swimming International, Olympic Committee.

In 1973, she was named as the Sportswoman of the Year for the San Antonio Express-News.

In 2001, she became an emeritus professor.

Forbes died in 2010.

Books
 Coaching Synchronized Swimming Effectively (1984)

References

American swimmers
1919 births
2010 deaths
Trinity University (Texas) alumni